Assem Ahmed Marei (Arabic: عاصم مرعي) is an Egyptian basketball player for Changwon LG Sakers of the Korean Basketball  League.

Marei first played for Egyptian side Zamalek SC, before being recognized by other leagues at the FIBA U-19 world Championship. Assem averaged 3rd most points per game, most steals per game, and 2nd most rebounds in the tournament right after Jonas Valančiūnas. Marei played for NCAA Division 2 side Minnesota State University Mavericks for a scholarship at the Minnesota State University.

Early life 
Marei was born on June 16, 1992 from parents who were both former basketball players at Zamalek SC. His father, Ahmed Marei, who played pivot as well, competed for the Egyptian Olympic team at the Los Angeles Games in 1984 and averaged 2.3 point per game.

Marei started playing basketball at the age of 8 after his father encouraged both him and his brother to play for the sport. Marei joined the national team at the age of 16.

Professional career

Zamalek SC (2010–2011) 
Marei played for his home club Zamalek until 2011, when he left for the Minnesota State University Mankato Mavericks.

Šiauliai (2015–2016) 
In September 2015, Marei signed with BC Šiauliai of the Lithuanian LKL.

Medi Bayreuth (2016–2018) 
On June 17, 2016, Marei signed with Medi Bayreuth which play in BBL

Pınar Karşıyaka (2018–2019) 
On July 19, 2018, Marei signed with Pınar Karşıyaka of the Turkish Basketball Super League (BSL). He was named the Most Valuable Player of the 2018–19 season after averaging 17.4 points and 9.6 rebounds in the regular season.

Bamberg (2019–2020)
On July 21, 2019, Marei signed a two-year contract with Brose Bamberg. Marei averaged 10.1 points and 6.0 rebounds per game.

Metropolitans 92 (2020)
On September 21, 2020, he signed with Metropolitans 92 of LNB Pro A.

Galatasaray (2020–2021)
On December 29, 2020, he signed with Galatasaray of the Turkish Basketball Super League (BSL).

International career
Marei played at the AfroBasket 2011, 2013 and 2015 with Egypt.

Marei led the AfroBasket 2013 in rebounding, averaging 11.6 per game. He was also named to the AfroBasket All-Tournament Team.

Honours
Egypt
 AfroBasket All-Tournament Team 2013
 Rebound Leader in 2013 Afrobasket
 Steal leader in 2011 U-19 World championship
NSIC
All-NSIC Second Team, NSIC All-Tournament Team, NCAA All-Central Region Team, 2012 NSIC Winter All-Academic Team: 2012-13 season 
First Team All-NSIC, DII Bulletin All-American Honorable Mention, NSIC All-Tournament Team: 2013-14 season 
All-NSIC First Team, Daktronics Central Region First Team honors,  NABC Central Region First Team honors

References

 

1992 births
Living people
Sportspeople from Giza
Egyptian men's basketball players
Power forwards (basketball)
BC Šiauliai players
Brose Bamberg players
Egyptian expatriate sportspeople in Germany
Egyptian expatriate sportspeople in Turkey
Egyptian expatriate sportspeople in the United States
Galatasaray S.K. (men's basketball) players
Karşıyaka basketball players
Medi Bayreuth players
Metropolitans 92 players
Minnesota State Mavericks men's basketball players
Zamalek SC basketball players
Changwon LG Sakers players
Minnesota State University, Mankato alumni